Rick Lee McCarty (born November 2, 1979) is an American college baseball coach, currently serving as head coach of the Abilene Christian Wildcats baseball team. McCarty played baseball for the Murray State Racers baseball team and John A. Logan College while obtaining a degree. He achieved his master's degree while coaching for the Delta State University baseball team.

Playing career
McCarty began his college baseball career at John A. Logan College during the 1999 and 2000 seasons. McCarty's play at Logan earned him a scholarship offer to Murray State University. In 2001, McCarty tied the school record with 8 saves. He was named Second Team All-Ohio Valley Conference that same season.

Coaching career
After spending a season as a student assistant while wrapping up his undergraduate degree at Murray State, McCarty became a graduate assistant at Delta State University in 2004.

On June 12 2018, McCarty was named the new head coach of the Abilene Christian Wildcats baseball team beginning the 2019 season.

Head coaching record

See also
 List of current NCAA Division I baseball coaches

References

External links
Abilene Christian Wildcats bio

Living people
1979 births
John A. Logan Volunteers baseball players
Murray State Racers baseball players
Murray State Racers baseball coaches
Delta State Statesmen baseball coaches 
Southeast Missouri State Redhawks baseball coaches
Campbell Fighting Camels baseball coaches
Louisiana Tech Bulldogs baseball coaches
Dallas Baptist Patriots baseball coaches
Abilene Christian Wildcats baseball coaches
Delta State University alumni
People from Campbellsville, Kentucky
Baseball coaches from Kentucky